The Thailand national rugby league team, or the Thailand Chang 13, is the national team that represents Thailand in rugby league. The Thailand national team is associated with TRL Rugby 13 National Rugby League (Thailand) Co,.Ltd, the organization that runs the yet-to-be-formed Thailand Domestic League and the yet-to-be-formed University Shield competitions. The organization is also trying to start the development of rugby league in the Kingdom of Thailand.

Games

The Thailand national team played their first international against the Hellenic Rugby League (Greece) at King Mongkut's Institute of Technology Stadium at Ladkrabang, Bangkok on October 12, 2013. The result saw the Greek side winning 90–0 against the first-ever team consisting of only Thai-ethnicity players to play rugby league. The only other game played under the banner of 'Thailand' was played a year earlier by an expat team, including five Thai heritage players, under the name of 'Thailand Stars' and run out of Sydney, Australia.

On the June 1, 2014 the Thailand Stars played Latin Heat Rugby League in Windsor, Sydney. After a hard-fought match played in wet conditions, the game ended in a draw.

Thailand will host 3 internationals in 2014, two in Bangkok and the other in Pattaya City.

See also

References

External links
The Official TRL Pages can be found at Thailand Rugby League Official Page and Official Facebook Page

Rugby League
National rugby league teams
Rugby league in Thailand